Harry C. Bradley was an American painter of pin-up art.

Not much is known about Bradley. He was a Philadelphia, Pennsylvania, based artist working in the 1940s and 1950s. He painted one of the most successful and enduring pin-up images of all time, Sitting Pretty, for Joseph C. Hoover and Sons of Philadelphia.

See also 
 Pin-up girl
 List of pin-up artists

References 

 

Artists from Philadelphia
Pin-up artists
American illustrators